"One More" is a song by Swedish singer, songwriter and rapper Elliphant featuring Danish singer and songwriter MØ, released through TEN Music Group and Kemosabe Records on 22 September 2014 as the lead single from her third extended play of the same name (2014). It was later included on her second studio album Living Life Golden (2016).

Track listing

Charts

Release history

References

2014 singles
2014 songs
Elliphant songs
MØ songs
Songs written by Elliphant
Songs written by Joel Little
Songs written by MØ